The posterior auricular ligament crosses from the eminence of the concha to the mastoid process of the temporal bone.

Human head and neck
Ligaments